Nikolaos Miaoulis (Greek: Νικόλαος Μιαούλης, 1818 - 1872) was a Greek navy personnel.  He was the son of Andreas Miaoulis, a revolutionary leader and was a member of the Miaoulis family from Hydra.

Biography
He was born in Hydra in 1818.  He studied at a military school in Munich together with Athanasios Miaoulis when he was small he entered on an English ship and enrolled himself into the Royal Navy and attended with evolution with his brother.  When his brother hired into politics, Nikolaos Miaoulis entered as an aide-de-camp to Otto until his abdication.  He died in Athens in 1872.

References
''This article is translated and is based from the article at the Greek Wikipedia (el:Main Page)

1818 births
1872 deaths
Hellenic Navy officers
Nikolaos
19th-century Greek military personnel
People from Hydra (island)